Victor Enrich (born 1976 in Barcelona) is a Catalan photographer.

City Portraits (2011)
City Portraits is a series of architectural photographs manipulated to create impossible structures, including a skyscraper split vertically in half, a house turned upside down and a motorway running vertically. Locations include Tel Aviv, Riga and Munich. Enrich said the photographs were not intended as commentary on architecture or urbanism but rather were "simply chosen to become a channel to express myself".

NHDK (2013)
In 2013 Enrich produced NHDK, a series of 88 manipulated photographs of the Deutscher Kaiser hotel in Munich. The images, which all display the building from the same angle, imagine it variously with parts rotated, duplicated, removed and floating in the sky.

References

External links
 Official website

Spanish photographers
Architectural photographers
Living people
1976 births